The Cupeño (or Kuupangaxwichem) are a Native American tribe of Southern California.

Today their descendants are members of the federally recognized tribes known as the Pala Band of Luiseno Mission Indians, Morongo Band of Cahuilla Mission Indians, and Los Coyotes Band of Cahuilla and Cupeno Indians.

History
Several different groups combined to form Cupeño culture around 1000 to 1200 AD. They were closely related to Cahuilla culture. The Cupeño people traditionally lived in the mountains in the San Jose Valley at the headwaters of the San Luis Rey River. Their name in their own language is "Kuupangaxwichem" ("people who slept here").

They lived in two autonomous villages, Wilákalpa and Kúpa (or Cupa), located north of present-day Warner Springs, California. Their homelands extended to Agua Caliente, located east of Lake Henshaw in an area now crossed by State Highway 79 near Warner Springs. The  Cupeño Indian village site is now abandoned but evidence of its historical importance remains.

Spanish and Mexican occupation 

Spaniards entered Cupeño lands in 1795 and took control of the lands by the 19th century. Warner, like most other large landholders in California at the time, depended primarily on Indian labor. The villagers of Kúpa provided most of Warner's workforce on his cattle ranch. The Cupeño continued to reside at what the Spanish called Agua Caliente after the American occupation of California in 1847 to 1848, during the Mexican–American War. They built an adobe ranch house in 1849 and barn in 1857, that were still standing as of 1963.

Warner encouraged the Cupeño to construct a stone fence around their village and to keep their livestock separated from that of the ranch. Ortega felt that if the village had created its own boundaries, the Cupeño would still live there today.

American occupation 

In observing the Cupeño's living conditions in 1846, W. H. Emory, a brevet major with the United States Army Corps of Engineers, described the Indians as being held in a state of serfdom by Warner, and as being ill-treated. In 1849, Warner was arrested by the American forces for consorting with the Mexican government and was taken to Los Angeles.

In 1851, because of several issues of conflict, Antonio Garra, a Yuma Indian living at Warner's Ranch, tried to organize a coalition of various southern California Indian tribes to drive out all of the European Americans. His 'Garra Revolt' failed, and the settlers executed Garra. The Cupeño had attacked Warner and his ranch, burning some buildings. They lost structures at their settlement of Kúpa, too. Warner sent his family to Los Angeles, but continued to operate the ranch with the help of others.

Forced eviction 

Following European contact but prior to the time of their eviction, the Cupeños sold milk, fodder, and craftwork to travelers on the Southern Immigrant Trail and passengers on the stagecoaches of the Butterfield Overland Mail, that stopped at Warner's Ranch and passed through the valley. The women made lace and took in laundry, which they washed in the hot springs. The men carved wood and manufactured saddle pads for horses. They also raised cattle and cultivated  of land. In 1880, after numerous suits and countersuits, European-American John G. Downey acquired all titles to the main portion of Warner's Ranch.

In 1892, Downey, the former governor of California and owner of the ranch since 1880, began proceedings to evict the Cupeño from the ranch property. Legal proceedings continued until 1903, when the court ruled in Barker v. Harvey against the Cupeño. The United States government offered to buy new land for the Cupeño, but they refused. In 1903, Cecilio Blacktooth, Cupeño chief at Agua Caliente, said: "If you give us the best place in the world, it is not as good as this. This is our home. We cannot live anywhere else; we were born here, and our fathers are buried here."

Cupeño trail of tears 

The forced relocation to the Pala reservation also included "the Luiseño villages at Puerta la Cruz and La Puerta, and the Kumeyaay villages at Mataguay, San José, and San Felipe." It was described by historian Phil Brigandi as "the last of Indian 'removals' in the United States, ending a federal policy of forced relocations that had begun 75 years earlier.

Reactions 
On the morning of the removal Roscinda Nolasquez, who was eleven years old at the time, recalled the last morning at Cupa. Orders were shouted in English at the Cupeño: “We were so scared. We didn’t know what he was saying. We didn’t know what was going on. We saw old people running back and forth. We cried, too, because we were afraid.” She recalls that morning trying to ensure that her cats would not be left behind, which she managed to find.

In 1903, an article for the Los Angeles Herald described it as such: “The springs proved the Indians’ undoing. White men wanted them, and now, after years of impatient waiting, they have possession. No matter the legal aspect of the case, the act is deplorable. It is one of the saddest sequels to the white man’s first notice to the [natives] on the Atlantic coast to move on. They have been moving on ever since.” An article for the Los Angeles Daily Times featured the headline: "Indians Bundled Away Like Cattle To Pala."

Two weeks after the forced relocation, American journalist Grant Wallace wrote, “Many of the older people were still ‘muy triste....’ Every other tent or brush ramada was still a ‘house of tears,’ for their love of home is stronger than with us.” The houses provided by the U.S. government were Ducker Patent Portable Houses; described in a report to the Indian Office as "very unsatisfactory," some of which quickly fell into disrepair or collapsed. In 1922, the Henshaw Dam was built, which significantly worsened the flow of the San Luis Rey River that ran through the relocation site.

Present-day 
Indians at the present-day reservations of Los Coyotes, San Ygnacio, Santa Ysabel, and Mesa Grande are among descendants of the Warner Springs Cupeño. Many Cupeño believe that their land at Kúpa will be returned to them. They are seeking legal relief to that end. The Cupa site serves as a rallying point for the land claims movement of contemporary Indian people, particularly their effort to regain cultural and religious areas.

Culture

The tribe is divided into two moieties, the Coyote and Wildcat, which are divided into several patrilineal clans. Clans are led by hereditary male clan leaders and assistant leaders. Marriages were traditionally arranged.
Traditional foods included acorns, cactus fruit, seeds, berries, deer, quail, rabbits, and other small game.

The Cupa Cultural Center was founded in 1974 in Pala and underwent a major expansion in 2005. The center exhibits artwork; hosts classes and activities such as basket making and beading; and offers Cupeño language classes. During the first weekend of every May, Cupa Days is celebrated at the cultural center.

Language
The Cupeño language belongs to the Cupan group, which includes the Cahuilla and Luiseño languages. This grouping is of the Takic branch within the Uto-Aztecan family of languages. Roscinda Nolasquez (1892–1987), of Mexican Yaqui descent, is considered the last truly fluent Cupeño speaker. The language today is widely regarded as being extinct. In 1994, linguist Leanne Hinton estimated one to five people still spoke Cupeño, and nine people in the 1990 US census said they spoke the language. Educational materials for the language exist and young people still learn to sing in Cupeño, particularly Bird Songs.

Population

Alfred L. Kroeber estimated the 1770 population of the Cupeño as 500. Lowell John Bean and Charles R. Smith put the total in 1795 between 500 and 750. By 1910, the Cupeño population had dropped to 150, according to Kroeber. Later estimates have suggested that there were fewer than 150 Cupeño in 1973, but about 200 in 2000.

Notes

References
 Bean, Lowell John, and Charles R. Smith. "Cupeño". Heizer, Robert F., volume ed. Handbook of North American Indians: California, Volume 8. pp. 91–98. Washington, DC: Smithsonian Institution, 1978. .
 Hinton, Leanne. Flutes of Fire: Essays on California Indian Languages. Berkeley: Heyday Books, 1994. 
 Pritzker, Barry M. A Native American Encyclopedia: History, Culture, and Peoples. Oxford: Oxford University Press, 2000. .

External links
 Pala Band of Mission Indians official website
 The Cupa people
 Barker v. Harvey (1901) -  US Supreme Court decision evicting the Cupeño

 
Native American tribes in California
California Mission Indians